The Battle of Mont Sorrel (Battle of Mount Sorrel, Battle of Hill 62) was a local operation in World War I by three divisions of the British Second Army and three divisions of the German 4th Army in the Ypres Salient, near Ypres, Belgium, from 2 to 13 June 1916.

To divert British resources from the build-up being observed on the Somme, the XIII (Royal Württemberg) Corps and the 117th Infantry Division attacked an arc of high ground defended by the Canadian Corps. The German forces captured the heights at Mount Sorrel and Tor Top, before entrenching on the far slope of the ridge. Following a number of attacks and counterattacks, two divisions of the Canadian Corps, supported by the 20th Light Division and Second Army siege and howitzer battery groups, recaptured the majority of their former positions.

Background
The crest of Mount Sorrel, nearby Tor Top (Hill 62) and Hill 61 rose approximately  higher than the shallow ground at Zillebeke, affording the occupying force excellent observation over the salient, the town of Ypres and approach routes. The peaks were the only portion of the crest of the Ypres ridge which remained in Allied hands.

In northern France, men and resources were being marshalled in preparation for the large British-French Somme Offensive. The build-up in the Somme did not go unnoticed by the  the German Supreme Army Command. The German 2nd Army, which was holding the sector north of the Somme, had observed preparations for an offensive since the end of February 1916. Short of resources due to the Battle of Verdun, the Germans could only mount local operations to divert British resources from the Somme.

On 28 May 1916, in an abrupt change of command, Lieutenant-General Edwin Alderson was appointed to the largely ceremonial post of Inspector General of Canadian Forces in England and was succeeded by Lieutenant-General Julian Byng as commander of the Canadian Corps.

Battle

German offensive
Byng inspected the Canadian Corps positions and noted that the Canadian troops were overlooked by German positions and under constant danger of enemy fire. He assigned 3rd Canadian Division commander, Major-General Malcolm Mercer to draw up a plan to overrun the more dangerous German positions in a local attack.

As the Canadians began preparations for an assault, the Germans were in the process of executing an assault plan of their own. The XIII (Royal Württemberg) Corps spent six weeks planning and carefully preparing their attack on the Mount Sorrel, Tor Top (Hill 62) and Hill 61 peaks. Their objective was to take control of the observation positions east of Ypres and keep as many British units as possible pinned down in the area, to avoid them transferring to the Somme front and assisting with the observed build-up in that area. The Germans constructed practice trenches resembling the Canadian positions near Tor Top to rehearse the assault, well behind their own lines.

In mid-May, aerial reconnaissance near Mont Sorrel indicated that German forces were preparing an attack. Royal Flying Corps (RFC) observers had noted the existence of works curiously resembling the Canadian positions, well behind the German lines. The Germans were also observed digging new sap trenches which implied that an assault was intended. The Canadian Corps had just begun developing plans to overrun the more dangerous German positions, when the Germans executed an assault of their own.

On the morning of 2 June, the German XIII Corps began a massive heavy artillery bombardment against the Canadian positions. Nine-tenths of the Canadian forward reconnaissance battalion became casualties during the bombardment. 3rd Canadian Division commander Major-General Malcolm Mercer and 8th Canadian Brigade commander Brigadier-General Victor Arthur Seymour Williams had been conducting an inspection of the front line, when the shelling began. Mercer was wounded three times and died early on 3 June; Williams was wounded in the face and head and taken prisoner.

At 1:00pm, German pioneers detonated four mines near the Canadian forward trenches, before the Germans attacked with six battalions, five more battalions in support and an additional six in reserve. When the German forces attacked, mainly against positions held by the 8th Canadian Brigade, resistance at the front lines was "minimal". For several critical hours both the 3rd Canadian Division and the 8th Canadian Brigade were leaderless and their level of defence suffered accordingly. Brigadier-General Edward Spencer Hoare Nairne of the Lahore Divisional Artillery, eventually assumed temporary command of the 3rd Canadian Division. German forces were still able to capture Mont Sorrel and Hill 61. Although the road to Ypres was open and undefended, no German officer took the initiative to exceed instructions and capitalize on the success experienced by the German forces.

Counterattack
Lieutenant-General Byng assembled a hastily organized counterattack in the early hours of 3 June. Owing to the casualties in the 3rd Canadian Division, two brigades of the 1st Canadian Division were temporarily placed under the control of Brigadier-General Hoare Nairne, who had assumed command of 3rd Canadian Division. The counterattack was scheduled for 2:00 am on 3 June 1916. Due to the distances that had to be covered by incoming units, the difficulties in communications and ever present enemy fire, the time allowed for assembly proved inadequate and the attack was postponed until 7:00 am. The signal to attack was to be six simultaneous green rockets. Some rockets misfired and did not burst, resulting in an uneven assault whereby each unit moved from their start lines at different times. The four attacking battalions suffered many casualties as they advanced over open ground in broad daylight.

British reinforcements and second German attack
British Expeditionary Force commander General Douglas Haig and Second Army commander General Herbert Plumer both believed it necessary to expel the Germans from the captured positions. In view of the preparations for the Somme offensive, Haig did not wish to divert more forces than were necessary. Support was limited to a number of additional artillery units and an infantry brigade from the 20th (Light) Division. It was suggested that the next counter-attack be carried out with the infantry available, with an emphasis on the use of large amounts of artillery.

The additional artillery units immediately went to work hampering German consolidation, by shelling their front and support lines and seeking out hostile batteries. The Germans sprung a surprise on the Canadians by exploding four large mines under trenches of the 2nd Canadian Division covering the spur at the eastern outskirts of the ruins of Hooge and a company of the Canadian 28th (North West) Battalion was wiped out in the explosions. The Canadians managed to hold their position and prevent the Germans from reaching their support line but Byng ultimately decided to leave the Hooge trenches in German hands and to concentrate on regaining Mount Sorrel and Tor Top. To dissuade the Germans from more attacks on the left flank of the Canadian Corps, the dismounted British 2nd Cavalry Brigade came on loan to the Canadian Corps as a counter-attack force.

Return to original lines

Byng ordered 1st Canadian Division commander Major-General Arthur Currie to organize a careful attack against the German positions at Mont Sorrel and Tor Top. Due to the casualties suffered during the unsuccessful counterattack of 3 June, Currie regrouped his stronger battalions into two composite brigades. Four intense bombardments of thirty minutes each were carried out between 9 and 12 June in an effort to deceive the Germans into expecting immediate attacks, which did not transpire. For ten hours on 12 June all the German positions between Hill 60 and Sanctuary Wood were shelled unremittingly. Particular attention was given to the Canadian Corps flanks, from which enfilade machine-gun fire might be expected. The following morning, the Germans were subjected to an additional 45 minutes of heavy artillery bombardment, before the assaulting troops advanced behind a generated smoke screen. The Germans are believed to have been taken largely by surprise as they offered little resistance and the Canadians were able to take approximately 200 prisoners. With the exception of the trenches at Hooge, the Germans fell back to their original lines and in a little over an hour the assault was over. On 14 June, the Germans launched two counterattacks which were repulsed, after which they advanced their trench to within  of the Canadians but made no further assaults.

Aftermath

Subsequent operations
The Canadian Corps remained in the Ypres Salient in a stationary yet aggressive status until the beginning of September when the corps was transferred to the Somme. In the aftermath of the battle and in the wake of the death of Major-General M.S. Mercer, Canadian Corps commander Julian Byng was forced to address the politically sensitive topic of appointing a new 3rd Canadian Division commander. Canadian Minister of Militia and Defence Sam Hughes telegraphed Byng and insisted that his son, 1st Canadian Brigade commander Brigadier-General Garnet Hughes, be given command of the 3rd Canadian Division. To the fury of the minister, Byng instead promoted 2nd Canadian Brigade commander Brigadier-General Louis Lipsett, a highly regarded pre-war British regular, to the post. The minister protested and confronted Byng in August 1916 but he did not relent, insisting that "he had nothing against Garnet Hughes there was simply a better man for the post". The change in command between Lieutenant-General Edwin Alderson and Julian Byng was also used as an opportunity to make additional changes. Much to the displeasure of Minister Hughes and delight of the Canadian troops, the unreliable Canadian Ross Rifle began to be replaced with the British Lee–Enfield and the Colt machine gun with the Vickers and Lewis machine guns.

Casualties

The German 26th Division lost  killed, wounded or missing, the 27th Division and Reserve Regiment 11 had  and the 117th Division suffered  Canadian Corps casualties from 2 to 14 June were

Commemoration
 The Canadian Corps participation in the Battle of Mount Sorrel is commemorated with the Hill 62 (Sanctuary Wood) Memorial. 
 In 2011, a special memorial to the 15th Battalion was also installed on 'Observatory Ridge' to commemorate where the unit fought during the battle.  It is found 15 metres west of the junction of Schachteweidestraat and Zandvoordestraat on the south side of the road at:.
 The nearby Sanctuary Wood Museum Hill 62 contains a preserved/simulated section of front line trenches occupied by the British and Canadians between 1916 and 1917. 
 Allied soldiers killed during the battle are buried in the nearby Sanctuary Wood Commonwealth War Graves Commission Cemetery, Hooge Crater Commonwealth War Graves Commission Cemetery, Maple Copse Commonwealth War Graves Commission Cemetery and Lijssenthoek Military Cemetery. 
 Those killed during the battle with no known resting place are commemorated on the Menin Gate in Ypres, Belgium. 
 The Royal Regiment of Canada conducts a Sorrel Day parade, open to the public, at the Fort York Armoury every year on the second Sunday in June.

Notes

References

External links

 Battle of Mount Sorrel
 The actions of Spring 1916

Battles of World War I involving Canada
Battles of World War I involving Germany
Battles of World War I involving the United Kingdom
Battles of the Western Front (World War I)
Ypres Salient
Tunnel warfare in World War I
1916 in Belgium
Conflicts in 1916
June 1916 events